The 18301 / 02 Intercity Express is an Express  train belonging to Indian Railways East Coast Railway zone that runs between  and  in India.

Coaches
The 18301 / 02 Intercity Express has eight general unreserved & two SLR (seating with luggage rake) coaches . It does not carry a pantry car coach.

As is customary with most train services in India, coach composition may be amended at the discretion of Indian Railways depending on demand.

Service

Routing

Traction
As the route is completely  electrified, a  based electric locomotive WAG 5A which pulls the train to its destination. It was the first train to get permanentE-Linkin Sambalpur-Titlagarh section

References

External links
18301 Intercity Express at India Rail Info
18302 Intercity Express at India Rail Info

Intercity Express (Indian Railways) trains
Rail transport in Odisha
Transport in Sambalpur